Riot on an Empty Street is the second album from Norwegian duo Kings of Convenience. It features two song collaborations with Canadian musician Feist. It peaked at #2 in Norway, #3 in Italy (staying in the chart for a year) and #49 in the UK.

Critical reception

Riot on an Empty Street received largely positive reviews from contemporary music critics. At Metacritic, which assigns a normalized rating out of 100 to reviews from mainstream critics, the album received an average score of 71, based on 18 reviews, which indicates "generally favorable reviews".

Track listing

Personnel
Kings of Convenience
Erlend Øye - lead (6, 12), co-lead (1, 3, 4, 7, 8, 11) and harmony (5, 9, 10) vocals, guitar (7, 11, 12), steel string guitar (3, 4, 5, 10), electric guitar (1), bass (8), drums (5, 6, 8, 12), piano (8), banjo (6), trumpet (6), arrangement (4, 6)
Eirik Glambek Bøe - lead (2, 5, 9, 10), co-lead (1, 3, 4, 7, 8, 11) and harmony (6) vocals, guitar (2, 5, 6, 7, 8, 9), nylon string guitar (1, 3, 4, 10), bass (8), piano (2, 5, 6, 7, 8, 9, 11), drums (7), arpeggios (11), percussion (8), banjo (7), arrangement (4, 6)
Additional personnel
Feist - lead vocals [outro] (5, 12)
Davide Bertolini - bass (7), upright bass (2, 4, 5, 6), bowed bass (11), arrangement (4, 6)
Tobias Hett - viola (2, 4, 6, 8), arrangement (4, 6)
Gary Peterson - trumpet (6), arrangement (6)
Siri Hilmen - cello (2, 3), cello [outro] (4), arrangement (3, 4)
Peter Kates - additional cymbals (8), hi-hat (8)
John-Arild Suther - trombone (9, 11)
Petter Alexander Olsen - creative consultant (9)

Certifications

References

Kings of Convenience albums
2004 albums
Albums produced by Ken Nelson (British record producer)
Astralwerks albums